Terry Murphy is a television host and correspondent, best known for her nine years (1989–1998) anchoring the tabloid show Hard Copy and, since 2003, reporting for the entertainment show Extra. Previously, she was a news anchor at WLS-TV in Chicago (1976–1980), and at KNXT/KCBS-TV (1980–1984) and KABC-TV (1984–1987), both in Los Angeles; she later returned to KCBS (1987–1989) before moving on to Hard Copy. Terry Murphy also worked for WJBK-TV (CBS) Detroit in the early 1970s. She appeared in a natural acting role as herself, on Married... with Children in the episode "Shoeway to Heaven" (1994).

Personal life
Murphy, a native of Columbus, Ohio and a Delta Gamma alumnus, lives in Los Angeles and is the divorced mother of two sons. Graduated from the University of Cincinnati in 1972. She recently got remarried to Murray Levy, a former security officer for Nicolas Cage.

Terry was an active fundraiser in Big Bear Lake, CA, where she served as host for the March of Dimes Celebrity Ski Classic from 1993–1996. Terry had a second home there at the time, where her son, Justin Timsit, ski raced with the Snow Summit Race Team.

She was born Terry Chellis. Went to Bishop Hartley High in Columbus and was 1966 Miss Ohio.

External links

Living people
American television personalities
People from Columbus, Ohio
1948 births